Eusebius of Nicomedia (died 341) was an Arian priest who baptized Constantine the Great on his deathbed in 337. A fifth-century legend evolved that Pope Sylvester I was the one to baptize Constantine, but this is dismissed by scholars as a forgery 'to amend the historical memory of the Arian baptism that the emperor received at the end of his life, and instead to attribute an unequivocally orthodox baptism to him.' He was a bishop of Berytus (modern-day Beirut) in Phoenicia. He was later made the bishop of Nicomedia, where the Imperial court resided. He lived finally in Constantinople from 338 up to his death.

Influence in the Imperial family and the Imperial court
Distantly related to the imperial family of Constantine, he owed his progression from a less significant Levantine bishopric to the most important episcopal see to his influence at court, and the great power he wielded in the church was derived from that source. In fact, during his time in the imperial court, the Eastern court and the major positions in the Eastern Church were held by Arians or Arian sympathizers. With the exception of a short period of eclipse, he enjoyed the confidence both of Constantine and Constantius II. He also served as the tutor of the later Emperor Julian the Apostate; and it was he who might have baptized Constantine the Great on May 22, 337 owing to his familial relationship with the emperor. Also during his time in the imperial court, Arianism became more popular with the royal family. It can be logically surmised that Eusebius had a huge hand in the acceptance of Arianism in the Constantinian household. The Arian influence grew so strong during his tenure in the imperial court that it was not until the end of the Constantinian dynasty and the appointment of Theodosius I that Arianism lost its influence in the empire.

It was of particular interest that Eusebius was nearly persecuted because of his close relationship to the Emperor Licinius while serving as bishop of Nicomedia during Licinius' reign.

Relationship with Arius
Like Arius, he was a pupil of Lucian of Antioch, and it is probable that he held the same views as Arius from the very beginning; he was also one of Arius' most fervent supporters who encouraged Arius. It was also because of this relationship that he was the first person whom Arius contacted after the latter was excommunicated from Alexandria by Alexander I of Alexandria in 321. Apparently, Arius and Eusebius were close enough and Eusebius powerful enough that Arius was able to put his theology down in writing. He afterward modified his ideas somewhat, or perhaps he only yielded to the pressure of circumstances; but he was, if not the teacher, at all events the leader and organizer of the Arian council.

At the First Council of Nicaea, 325, he signed the Confession, but only after a long and desperate opposition in which he was said to "subscribe with hand only, not heart" according to ancient sources. It was a huge blow to the Arian party since it was surmised that the participants in the First Council of Nicaea were evenly split between non-Arians and Arians.
His defense of Arius angered the emperor, and a few months after the council
he was sent into exile due to his continual contacts with Arius and his followers. After the lapse of three years, he succeeded in regaining the imperial favor by convincing Constantine that Arius and his views do not conflict with the  proclaimed Nicene Creed. After his return in 329 he brought the whole machinery of the state government into action in order to impose his views upon the Church.

Political and religious career
In complement to his theological interests, Eusebius was a skilled politician. Upon his return, he regained the lost ground resulting from the First Council of Nicaea, established alliances with other groups such as the Melitians and expelled many opponents.

He was described by modern historians as an "ambitious intriguer"  and a "consummate political player". He was also described by ancient sources as a high-handed person who was also aggressive in his dealings.; he also used his allies to spy on his opponents.

He was able to dislodge and exile three key opponents who espoused the First Council of Nicaea: Eustathius of Antioch in 330, Athanasius of Alexandria in 335 and Marcellus of Ancyra in 336. This was no small feat since Athanasius was regarded as a "man of God" by Constantine, and both Eustathius and Athanasius held top positions in the church.

Another major feat was his appointment as the Patriarch of Constantinople by expelling Paul I of Constantinople; Paul would eventually return as Patriarch after Eusebius's death.

Even outside the empire, Eusebius had great influence. He brought Ulfilas into the Arian priesthood and sent the latter to convert the heathen Goths.

Eusebius baptised Constantine the Great in his villa in Nicomedia, on May 22, 337 just before the death of the Emperor.

Death and aftermath
He died at the height of his power in the year 341.

He was so influential that even after his death, Constantius II heeded his and Eudoxus of Constantinople's advice to attempt to convert the Roman Empire to Arianism by creating Arian Councils and official Arian Doctrines.

It was because of Eusebius that "On the whole, Constantine and his successors made life pretty miserable for Church leaders committed to the Nicene decision and its Trinitarian formula."

Eusebius of Nicomedia is not to be confused with his contemporary Eusebius of Caesarea, the author of well-known early books of Church History.

Notes

References

External links
Correspondence of Eusebius of Nicomedia:
 Arius to Eusebius
 Eusebius to Arius
 Eusebius to Paulinus of Tyre
 Eusebius to the Council of Nicaea
 Constantine on Eusebius' deposition
 Eusebius' confession of faith

 
 

4th-century Romans
Arian bishops
341 deaths
Constantine the Great and Christianity
Year of birth unknown
Bishops of Nicomedia
4th-century Archbishops of Constantinople
People excommunicated by Christian churches
Nature of Jesus Christ